The Bishnupur district of Manipur state in India is divided into 3 administrative sub-districts called blocks. As per the 2011 Census of India, it has 7 towns and 49 villages. Some of these village administrations have been re-organized since then.

Blocks

Towns 

Note: Oinam, Kwakta, and Kumbi were designated as Nagar Panchayats at the time of the 2011 census, but are now designated as Municipal Councils.

Villages

Nambol block

Bishnupur block

Moirang block

References 

Bishnupur